The Secret Life of Rosewood Avenue is a British radio comedy series, first broadcast on BBC Radio 4 in 1991. Written by Stephen Sheridan, it starred James Grout, Margaret Courtenay, Jean Heywood and Christopher Good. The show was produced by Lissa Evans.

The series has been repeated on BBC Radio 7 and BBC Radio 4 Extra.

Cast
 James Grout as Reverend Timothy Carswell
 Margaret Courtenay as Miss Tilling
 Jean Heywood as Miss Tapp
 Christopher Good as Dr Warlock

Plot
The show concerns the Reverend Timothy Carswell, a timid and somewhat naive vicar who is assigned to an apparently respectable suburban parish. However, the area is actually a hotbed of (among other things) gossip, passion, geriatric prostitution and murder, all of which is going on under Reverend Carswell's unsuspecting nose.

Episodes

External links
 
 RadioListings Episode Guide

BBC Radio comedy programmes
BBC Radio 4 programmes
1991 radio programme debuts